The Real Swiss Family Robinson is a four-part BBC television miniseries in which different families leave their regular lives behind and sample life on a desert island.

Episode list

External links 
 

BBC television documentaries
2009 British television series debuts
2009 British television series endings